Jan Baránek Jr. (born 26 June 1993) is a former Czech football player who last played for FC Viktoria Plzeň in the Czech First League. His father is former football midfielder Jan Baránek and his uncle is Vít Baránek.

Baránek has played international football at under-21 level for Czech Republic U21.

A string of serious knee injuries prevented him from playing any competitive matches for 18 months between July 2016 and January 2018. In February 2018, unable to fully recover from his injuries, he retired from professional football at the age of 24.

References

External links
 Jan Baránek, Czech FA

1993 births
Living people
Czech footballers
FC Baník Ostrava players
Czech First League players
Czech Republic under-21 international footballers
Association football defenders
FC Viktoria Plzeň players
Czech Republic youth international footballers
Sportspeople from Opava